Wade Thompson was an American Negro league pitcher in the 1920s.

Thompson played for the Richmond Giants in 1922, and for the Harrisburg Giants the following season. In seven recorded career games, he posted a 4.76 ERA over 39.2 innings.

References

External links
Baseball statistics and player information from Baseball-Reference Black Baseball Stats and Seamheads

Year of birth missing
Year of death missing
Place of birth missing
Place of death missing
Harrisburg Giants players
Richmond Giants players
Baseball pitchers